Babes in Toyland may refer to:

 Babes in Toyland (operetta), a 1903 operetta by Victor Herbert
 Babes in Toyland (1934 film), a musical comedy starring Laurel and Hardy, based on the Victor Herbert operetta
 Babes in Toyland (TV special), a 1955 TV special with Barbara Cook
 Babes in Toyland (1961 film), a Disney musical starring Ray Bolger, Annette Funicello and Tommy Sands, again based on the Victor Herbert operetta
 Babes in Toyland (soundtrack), the soundtrack album from the 1961 film
 Babes in Toyland (1986 film), a television movie starring Drew Barrymore and Keanu Reeves, using only two songs from the Victor Herbert operetta
 Babes in Toyland (1997 film), an animated film featuring the voices of Christopher Plummer, Joey Ashton and Lacey Chabert, using only one musical number from the Victor Herbert operetta
 Babes in Toyland (band), an American punk rock band

See also 
 Toyland (disambiguation)